The Ryther Hoard is a hoard of coins found in a ceramic jug from Ryther cum Ossendyke, North Yorkshire, England.

Discovery
The hoard was discovered by a metal detectorist on 4 April 1992 in a field near the village of Ryther. He discovered two silver coins at a depth of  before contacting the landowner about the potential find. Together they excavated the hoard by hand. 812 silver coins and the ceramic vessel were originally found, with a further 5 silver coins being added from a later search of the site. They were declared as Treasure trove at an inquest at Harrogate Magistrate's Court on 9 October 1992.

Contents

Coins
The hoard comprises 817 coins found together with the ceramic jug. Most of the coins were English and included 238 groats, 30 half-groats, 532 pennies, and 2 counterfeit pennies. There were also four Irish groats, two Scottish pennies, and seven coins of the Low Countries. They date from the reigns of Edward I through to the Henry VII. The hoard was, thus, deposited in the late 15th century AD.

Jug
The jug is a small example of the Humber ware industry dating to the 15th century AD. The type is typically crude, unfinished, and never glazed. They are sometimes referred to as 'drinking jugs' but residue analysis has shown that they were frequently used as urinals.

Acquisition and display
The hoard was acquired by the Yorkshire Museum.

In July 2021 it was displayed in an exhibition on the reign of King Richard III, in which a portrait of the King from the National Portrait Gallery was displayed.

References

External links
"Yorkshire Hoards – The Ryther Hoard" by Andrew Woods.
"Curator's Talk - The Ryther Hoard"

1992 in England
Archaeological sites in Yorkshire
Metal detecting finds in England
History of North Yorkshire
Collections of the Yorkshire Museum
Treasure troves in England
Archaeological sites in North Yorkshire
1992 archaeological discoveries
Coin hoards